Amsterdamned is a 1988 Dutch slasher film directed and written by Dick Maas, and stars Huub Stapel, Monique van de Ven, and Serge-Henri Valcke. The plot revolves around a serial killer who uses the famed canals of the Dutch capital to murder random people, one of which involves a detective's girlfriend linked to the murders.

Plot 
Opening in a point-of-view shot, a murderer looks around the city of Amsterdam at night through the canals. He sneaks into a Chinese restaurant's backdoor and steals a butcher knife while the cooks aren't looking. The killer finds his first victim in a local prostitute who, after refusing advances from a cab driver, gets thrown out of the cab. A bag lady watches from a distance as the killer plunges the knife into the hooker and drags her back into the water. The next morning, a tour boat on the canal collides with the body of the prostitute, who has been hung on one of the small bridges. As the tourists scream, the body drags on the top of the boat until an opening shows her bloodied body and face.

Assigned to the case is detective Eric Visser, a hard-boiled detective who is raising his 13-year-old daughter Anneke after a split from his ex. He spends an hour in a bath, comes home late from work, and tends to drink now and again. Nevertheless, Eric is praised as one of the best detectives on the force. His partner, Vermeer, meets Eric at the site where the body was found with fellow cop Potter attempting to get through to the baglady, who tells Eric that it was a monster who killed the prostitute and that it came out of the water.

That night, two environmentalists are taking water samples in an ongoing investigation against a nearby chemical plant. However, when the killer emerges, one of the men is taken underwater and when his partner attempts to grab the anchor, he is horrified to find the man's head on the anchor. Scared, the surviving environmentalist swims to the nearby shore and calls for help when he sees a truck pass by. As the truck driver comes out from a distance, the killer grabs the environmentalist and drags him back into the water.

When Eric and Vermeer see the bodies of the environmentalists, he is convinced that there is a serial killer. Eric runs into John, an old friend from the police academy. John works for the river police and we learn that Eric's ex-girlfriend used to date John before Eric stole her from him. When John asks about what happened, John and Eric renew their friendship and are now partners on the case to find the killer.

During a search at a local sporting club, Eric meets Laura, a museum guide as well as Martin Ruysdael, a former diver turned psychiatrist and Laura's doctor/friend. Eric begins to have eyes for Laura and she begins to like him too. Meanwhile, that night, a salvationist and a young woman on an inflatable sunbed the next day are the next victims of the killer. As Eric begins to get frustrated with nothing turning up, he and John eventually think they find a suspect in a former chemical plant employee known for his violent outbursts. When the suspect is caught, Eric begins to have doubts. When he sees Laura that night, a skipper at the nearby dock is the killer's next victim with the boat sinking. A witness notice that and call the police.

John decides to go underwater and investigate the next day. At first, he finds the skipper's body but as he approaches out of the skipper's sunken boat, the killer emerges and a tussle leaves John slashed and killed. Eric arrives to hear the bad news about John. When the killer is located at a marina, a speedboat chase ensues between Eric and the killer. Eric eventually tracks the killer to a local sewer only to be shot at close range in the shoulder with a harpoon gun. When the killer attempts a coup de grâce, Eric shoots the mask before waking up in the hospital.

When Laura goes to her appointment and finds Martin isn't home, she stays but hears a noise in Martin's underwater basement. She finds the broken mask and thinks Martin is the killer. An attempt to call Eric fails when he is still unconscious. When he awakens, the nurse tells him of Laura and both he and Vermeer head to Martin's house. Martin arrives and waits for Laura only to hear a sound in his basement. Laura confronts him and hits him repeatedly with an oar. However, the killer comes out of the water and grabs Laura. Eric arrives in time and shoots the killer. Martin finally confesses that the killer is a childhood friend of him and fellow diver who was shunned by society after a commercial diving job caused him to be disfigured by uranium hexafluoride poisoning. The killer arrives at his home, where he reveals himself and decides to take his own life before the police arrive.

Before ending the movie, Eric Visser and Laura move on the canals in boat.

Cast 
Huub Stapel as Eric Visser 
Monique van de Ven as Laura 
Serge-Henri Valcke as Vermeer
Tanneke Hartzuiker as Potter 
Wim Zomer as John van Meegeren 
Tatum Dagelet as Anneke Visser 
Hidde Maas as Martin Ruysdael 
Lou Landré as Chef
Edwin Bakker as Willy 
Barbara Martijn as Prostitute 
Leontine Ruiters as Girl in gumboat (credited as Leontien Ruyters)
Jules Croiset as Mayor
Jaap Stobbe as Cab driver

Release
Amsterdamned was released on home video in the United Kingdom by Vestron in November 1989.

Reception
At the American Film Market in 1988, the movie would go on to become the third highest selling motion picture that year. Vestron Pictures released the film dubbed in English on home video. The dubbed version featured the voices of lead actors Huub Stapel, Monique van de Ven, and Serge-Henri Valcke in English, as they spoke English well. The film was given a limited release, grossing $14,819 on 5 screens in its opening weekend in North America, and a total of $98,003 over its entire run.

Stunts
The speedboat chase scene and other stunts were handled by Dickey Beer. Legendary stuntman turned stunt coordinator Vic Armstrong worked on the film as a stuntman. The speedboat chase scene left Huub Stapel out of production for three weeks when the boat he rode in crashed on the set of the film. A scene in which the killer drives his speedboat off a ramp from one side of a bridge to another had been seen in a few cinema programs on U.S.-based station TLC. Parts of the speedboat chase were filmed in the Oudegracht of Utrecht.

Soundtrack
The soundtrack by Dick Maas is available on the Apple Music streaming platform.

Loïs Lane - "Amsterdamned"

References

External links
 

1988 films
1988 horror films
1988 thriller films
1980s mystery films
Dutch thriller films
Dutch horror films
1980s Dutch-language films
Films set in the Netherlands
Films set in Amsterdam
Films shot in Amsterdam
Films shot in the Netherlands
1980s serial killer films
Underwater action films
Films directed by Dick Maas
Dutch slasher films
1980s slasher films